Surat Railway Station (Code: ST) is a major railway station serving Surat, beside Gothangam, Kosad,  and . It is under the administrative control of the Western Railway zone of the Indian Railways. Surat is A1 – category railway station of Western Railway Zone of Indian Railways. It is on the Ahmedabad–Vadodara–Mumbai rail route. The railway station was built in 1860.

Going north,  Railway Station is the nearest railhead.  Railway Station is to the south of Surat.

In early 2016, the Indian Railway Catering and Tourism Corporation rated the facility the best large station in India based on cleanliness. Railway station of Surat is on the first floor from ground.

Surat Municipal Corporation planning to create world class new railway station.

The nearest international airport is Surat Airport.

Major trains

Following trains start from Surat railway station:

 Surat–Bandra Terminus Intercity Superfast Express
 Surat–Mumbai Central Flying Ranee Superfast Express
 Surat–Hapa Intercity Weekly Superfast Express
 Surat–Chhapra Tapti Ganga Express
 Surat–Bhagalpur Tapti Ganga Superfast Express
 Surat–Muzaffarpur Express
 Surat–Mahuva Superfast Express
 Surat–Malda Town Express
 Surat–Amravati Express
 Surat–Puri Superfast Express

Gallery

References

Railway stations in Surat district
Mumbai WR railway division
Transport in Surat
Buildings and structures in Surat
Railway stations opened in 1952